Kim Jin-wook (born August 5, 1960) is the former manager of the Doosan Bears and KT Wiz of the KBO League.

References

External links
 Career statistics and player information from Korea Baseball Organization

KT Wiz managers
Doosan Bears managers
Doosan Bears coaches
Ssangbangwool Raiders players
Doosan Bears players
South Korean baseball managers
South Korean baseball coaches
South Korean baseball players
KBO League pitchers
People from Yeongcheon
1961 births
Living people
Sportspeople from North Gyeongsang Province